The men's sabre was one of seven fencing events on the fencing at the 1936 Summer Olympics programme. It was the tenth appearance of the event. The competition was held from 14 August 1936 to 15 August 1936. 71 fencers from 26 nations competed. Nations were limited to three fencers each. The event was won by Endre Kabos of Hungary, the fourth of nine straight Games in which a Hungarian would win the event. Kabos became the second man to win multiple medals in the individual sabre, adding to his 1932 bronze. Gustavo Marzi of Italy took silver, while Hungarian Aladár Gerevich earned bronze.

Background
This was the 10th appearance of the event, which is the only fencing event to have been held at every Summer Olympics. Four of the ten finalists from 1932 returned: silver medalist Giulio Gaudini of Italy, bronze medalist Endre Kabos of Hungary, and sixth-place finisher John Huffman and ninth-place finisher Norman Cohn-Armitage of the United States. Hungary, dominant in the event since the 1908 Games, was expected to perform well again. Kabos had won the world championships in 1933 and 1934; teammate Aladár Gerevich had won in 1935.

Brazil and Costa Rica each made their debut in the men's sabre. Italy and Denmark each made their eighth appearance in the event, tied for most of any nation, each having missed two of the first three events but having appeared every Games since 1908.

Competition format

The competition format was pool play round-robin, with bouts to five touches. Not all bouts were played in some pools if not necessary to determine advancement. Two points were awarded for each bout won. Ties were broken through fence-off bouts in early rounds if necessary for determining advancement, but by touches received in final rounds (and for non-advancement-necessary placement in earlier rounds).

 Round 1: There 9 pools of between 7 and 9 fencers each. The top 4 fencers in each pool advanced to the quarterfinals.
 Quarterfinals: There were 6 pools of 6 fencers each. The top 3 fencers in each quarterfinal advanced to the semifinals.
 Semifinals: There were 3 pools of 6 fencers each. The top 3 fencers in each semifinal advanced to the final.
 Final: The final pool had 9 fencers.

Schedule

Results

Round 1

The top four fencers in each pool advanced to the quarterfinals.

Pool 1

Brook defeated Bentancur in the play-off for fourth place and the last advancement spot.

Pool 2

Pool 3

Pool 4

Harry defeated Szatmary in the play-off for fourth place and the last advancement spot.

Pool 5

Moreno was the winner of the three-way play-off with Kirchmann and Christiansen for fourth place and the last advancement spot.

Pool 6

Pool 7

The official report lists a three-way for second-place, but under the scoring system in use Wahl was alone due to fewest touches received.

Pool 8

Pool 9

Quarterfinals

The top three fencers in each pool advanced to the semifinals.

Quarterfinal 1

Quarterfinal 2

Quarterfinal 3

Quarterfinal 4

Vasilev won the three-way play-off against Krause and Montfoort for third place and the last advancement spot.

Quarterfinal 5

Quarterfinal 6

Semifinals

The top three fencers in each pool advanced to the final.

Semifinal 1

Semifinal 2

Semifinal 3

Final

Ties in the final, including the tie for silver, were broken by touches received rather than play-off bouts. Thus, even though Gerevich had defeated Marzi in their bout during the pool play, Marzi took the silver and Gerevich bronze without any rematch due to the 22–26 advantage Marzi had in touches received. Kabos's loss to Marzi was his only loss in the entire tournament, as he finished 24–1 overall.

References

Sabre men
Men's events at the 1936 Summer Olympics